= Ultrapolynomial =

In mathematics, an ultrapolynomial is a power series in several variables whose coefficients are bounded in some specific sense.

== Definition ==
Let $d \in \mathbb{N}$ and $K$ a field (typically $\mathbb{R}$ or $\mathbb{C}$) equipped with a norm (typically the absolute value). Then a function $P: K^d \rightarrow K$ of the form $P(x) = \sum_{\alpha \in \mathbb{N}^d} c_\alpha x^\alpha$ is called an ultrapolynomial of class $\left\{ M_p \right\}$, if the coefficients $c_\alpha$ satisfy $\left| c_\alpha \right| \leq C L^{\left| \alpha \right|}/M_\alpha$ for all $\alpha \in \mathbb{N}^d$, for some $L>0$ and $C>0$ (resp. for every $L>0$ and some $C(L)>0$).
